is a railway station on the Rikuu East Line in the city of Ōsaki, Miyagi Prefecture, Japan, operated by East Japan Railway Company (JR East).

Lines
Yūbikan Station is served by the Rikuu East Line, and is located 25.8 rail kilometers from the terminus of the line at Kogota Station.

Station layout

Yūbikan Station has one side platform, serving a single bi-directional track. The station is unattended.

History
Yūbikan Station opened on 13 February 1996.

Surrounding area
Yūbikan
Site of Iwadeyama Castle

See also
 List of Railway Stations in Japan

External links

 

Railway stations in Miyagi Prefecture
Rikuu East Line
Railway stations in Japan opened in 1996
Ōsaki, Miyagi
Stations of East Japan Railway Company